State Route 162 (SR 162) is a south–north state highway in the central part of the U.S. state of Georgia. Most of its route is located in Newton County; the rest is in Rockdale County.

Route description
SR 162 begins at an intersection with SR 36 southwest of Stewart in Newton County, southeast of Atlanta. Traveling north, SR 162 meets SR 212 northwest of Stewart. Then, it meets SR 81 just southwest of Porterdale. It heads northwest to the extreme southeastern corner of Conyers, where it meets its northern terminus at Interstate 20/U.S. Route 278/SR 12. It serves as a major connector road for residents of southern Newton County and has seen significant growth in the past ten years.

Major intersections

SR 162 Connector

State Route 162 Connector (SR 162 Conn.) is a  connector route of SR 162 southwest of Porterdale. The road, also known as Jackson Road, begins at an intersection with SR 162 in a rural area. It heads north, passing numerous homes and wooded areas, then makes a sweeping S-curve before heading north again. Except near its midpoint, where it passes an auto dealership and a general store, SR 162 Conn. travels through residential areas. The road comes to an end at a stop-controlled intersection with SR 81 inside the city limits of Porterdale.

See also

References

External links

 Georgia Roads (Routes 161 - 180)

162
Transportation in Newton County, Georgia
Transportation in Rockdale County, Georgia